Paul de Lavallaz (born 1901, died 1995) was a Swiss footballer. He competed in the men's tournament at the 1928 Summer Olympics. He also played on the Grasshopper Club in Switzerland around that same era.

References

External links
 

1900 births
Year of death missing
Swiss men's footballers
Switzerland international footballers
Olympic footballers of Switzerland
Footballers at the 1928 Summer Olympics
Place of birth missing
Association football midfielders